Sulat, officially the Municipality of Sulat, is a 4th class municipality in the province of Eastern Samar, Philippines. According to the 2020 census, it has a population of 15,758 people.

Geography

Barangays
Sulat is politically subdivided into 18 barangays.

Climate

Demographics

Economy

Tourism
Sulat River Sulat River possesses beautiful sceneries of the sunrise and sunset with water flowing in from the Pacific Ocean. The river is primarily used by native fishing boats and passenger boats making trips to nearby islands.

Luyang Beach Luyang Beach has patches of corals in ancient underwater limestone formations with a wide variety of tropical aquatic life along the Pacific coast.

Makati Island Makati Island has a pristine white sand beach and seasonal waves for surfers and skimboarders. The island has accommodation for visitors to stay overnight and is being considered by the Department of Tourism for further development.

Panini-hian Sunrise View Pacific Resort Panini-hian Sunrise View Pacific Resort is within walking distance of Luyang Beach. Cottages for rent are available in the resort under the supervision of the Local Government Unit. Further development is ongoing.

Podpod A traditional Waray fishcake dish prevalent in Barangay Santa Vicente. The fishcake is made by first boiling fish with water and salt. Once cooked, the fish meat is separated from the stock and its bones. The meat is then squeezed so take out the liquid. Afterwards, the fish meat is packed into bamboo shapers until the fish meat is flat and in circular shape. The fishmeat is then taken out from the mold and smoked. The podpod can be eaten as it is or used in the od'ong, a traditional Waray soup and noodle dish.

Education

Secondary schools 
 Sulat National High School
 Santo Niño National High School
 San Vicente Integrated School
 MSH Loyola Academy

Elementary schools

References

External links
 [ Philippine Standard Geographic Code]
 Philippine Census Information
 Local Governance Performance Management System

Municipalities of Eastern Samar